Huainan is a city in Anhui, China

Huainan may also refer to:
 Huainan, the area south of the Huai River and north of the Yangtze River in central Anhui
 Huainan Circuit, one of the major administrative units of the Tang dynasty
 Wu (Ten Kingdoms) (907–937), a state in imperial China's Five Dynasties and Ten Kingdoms period also known as Huainan
 King of Huainan, a noble title in the Han Dynasty (206 BC – 220 AD)
 Huainanzi, a 2nd-century BC Chinese philosophical classic